Mount Raymond is a  mountain summit located in Salt Lake County, Utah, United States.

Description
Mount Raymond is set along the boundary of the Mount Olympus Wilderness on land managed by Wasatch National Forest, with Salt Lake City 11 miles to the west and Park City 11 miles to the east. It is situated in the Wasatch Range which is a subset of the Rocky Mountains. Neighbors include Mount Olympus four miles to the west, Kesler Peak three miles southeast, and line parent Gobblers Knob is 1.5 mile to the northeast. Precipitation runoff from the mountain's north slope drains to Mill Creek, whereas the south slope drains to Big Cottonwood Creek. This mountain's toponym has been officially adopted by the United States Board on Geographic Names.

Gallery

See also

References

External links

 Mount Raymond: weather forecast
 National Geodetic Survey Data Sheet

Mountains of Utah
Mountains of Salt Lake County, Utah
North American 3000 m summits
Wasatch-Cache National Forest
Wasatch Range